Kiki Bertens was the defending champion, but lost in the quarterfinals to Lourdes Domínguez Lino.
Francesca Schiavone won the title, defeating Domínguez Lino in the final, 6–1, 6–3.

Seeds

Draw

Finals

Top half

Bottom half

Qualifying

Seeds

Qualifiers

Lucky losers
  Nina Bratchikova
  Alexandra Cadanțu

Draw

First qualifier

Second qualifier

Third qualifier

Fourth qualifier

References
 Main Draw
 Qualifying Draw

Grand Prix SAR La Princesse Lalla Meryem Singles
2013 Women's Singles
2013 in Moroccan tennis